San Jose Villanueva is a small municipality in the Department of La Libertad, El Salvador. San Jose Villanueva has a population of 14,000 inhabitants (according to the PNC) and 9,896 inhabitants (according to SIBASI 2001).  It is located in the south of the Department, bordered by the cities of Nuevo Cuscatlán to the north, Huizucar to the east, the port of La Libertad to the south and Zaragoza to the west.  The town contains a health clinic, six schools, an institute, a Catholic church, and seven Protestant churches.  In the last several years, the municipality has seen an influx of the upper middle class, including the introduction of a gated housing development.  Principal crops include grains, coffee, and grasses.  There are businesses in cattle, pigs, and poultry.  Among the successful industries are the Beneficiary of Coffee and the Dairy Elaboration.  There are paved access roads.  Of note is a local archaeological site, the Piedra Pintada (Painted Stone), a rock inscribed with three meters of ancient hieroglyphics.

References 

Municipalities of the La Libertad Department (El Salvador)